The 1868 West Virginia gubernatorial election took place on October 22, 1868, to elect the governor of West Virginia.

Results

References

1868
gubernatorial
West Virginia
October 1868 events